Jesse Rath (born February 11, 1989) is a Canadian actor. He starred in the television series 18 to Life as Carter Boyd and as Ram on Aaron Stone. He also appeared on the Syfy series Defiance playing the role of Alak Tarr, on Being Human as Robbie Malik and on Supergirl as Brainiac 5.

Life and career
Rath was born in Montreal, Quebec, Canada. His mother is of Goan Indian descent, whereas his father is of English and Austrian-Jewish heritage.  His older sister is actress Meaghan Rath.

Rath's first role was in 2005, as a runner in the sports film The Greatest Game Ever Played, and he later joined a low-budget movie, Prom Wars: Love Is a Battlefield, followed by The Trotsky. He got his biggest break on television in 2009 after getting cast in the miniseries Assassin's Creed: Lineage, playing Federico Auditore, the role of one of the sons of the lead character, Giovanni. The same year, he was cast in a recurring role in the Disney XD show Aaron Stone. He was then cast as one of the main leads in the CBC show 18 to Life. He starred in a direct-to-video film, The Howling: Reborn. He later joined another Canadian series, Mudpit. He also guest-starred on Being Human, playing the role of the younger brother of the female lead, his real-life sister Meaghan Rath. In mid-2012, he was cast in the sci-fi television series Defiance.

He was co-nominated for two Gemini Awards in 2010 and 2011, for Best Ensemble Performance in a Comedy Program or Series, for 18 to Life.  He is also known for his role as quirky Brainiac-5 of Supergirl (2018-2021).

Filmography

Awards and nominations

References

External links
 
 TVGuide
 Twitter

1989 births
Living people
Male actors from Montreal
Anglophone Quebec people
Canadian people of Austrian-Jewish descent
Canadian people of British descent
Canadian actresses of Indian descent
Canadian people of Goan descent
Canadian male child actors
Canadian male film actors
Canadian male television actors
21st-century Canadian male actors
Jewish Canadian actors